Juan Bautista Gaona Figueredo (30 June 1845 – 18 May 1932) was provisional President of Paraguay October 18, 1904 – December 8, 1905 and later served as Vice President from 1910 to 1911. He was Minister of Finance of Paraguay in December 1904. He was a member of the Liberal Party. His presidency began the period of dominance for the Liberal Party which lasted for more than 30 years.

References

Presidents of Paraguay
Vice presidents of Paraguay
Presidents of the Senate of Paraguay
Finance Ministers of Paraguay
Paraguayan people of Basque descent
1845 births
1932 deaths
Liberal Party (Paraguay) politicians